Gorkha Beer is a brand of beer brewed in Nepal. It is a premium quality beer, brewed by Gorkha Brewery Ltd. and launched in May 2006. The alcohol content is listed in its label to be 5.0% alc/vol. It is one of the few beers produced in Nepal. The name derives from the Gurkha, people of Nepal.

Gorkha Brewery (P) Ltd. was established in 1989. It is owned by Nepalese Khetan group.

See also 
 Gorkha Airlines

External links
 Gorkha Brewery, Gorkha Beer
 Gurkha beer reaches new heights, Packaging Magazine
 Berlin’s Very Own Beer Festival, Deutsche Welle

Beer in Asia
Alcohol in Nepal
Nepalese brands
Nepalese drinks
Gurkhas